The 2012 Ladbrokes.com World Darts Championship was the 19th World Championship organised by the Professional Darts Corporation since it separated from the British Darts Organisation. The event took place at the Alexandra Palace between 15 December 2011 and 2 January 2012.

Adrian Lewis was the defending champion having won the 2011 tournament. Phil Taylor became the last remaining player to have played in every PDC World Championship, after Dennis Priestley failed to qualify. For the first time players from Malaysia, Portugal and Serbia qualified.

Lewis was able to defend his title against Andy Hamilton in the final with a 7–3 win.

Sid Waddell, having commentated on the BDO World Championship from 1978 to 1994 for the BBC and on the PDC World Championship from 1995 to 2011 for Sky Sports, was forced to miss the 2012 PDC World Championship, having been diagnosed with bowel cancer in September 2011. He died in August 2012.

Format and qualifiers
The televised stages features 72 players. The top 32 players in the PDC Order of Merit on 28 November 2011 are seeded for the tournament. They will be joined by the 16 highest non qualified players in the Players Championship Order of Merit from events played on the PDC Pro Tour.

These 48 players are joined by two PDPA qualifiers (to be determined at a PDPA Qualifying event to be held in Wigan on 28 November 2011), the winner of the PDC Youth Tour Order of Merit, and 21 international players: the 4 highest names in the European Order of Merit not already qualified, and 17 further international qualifiers to be determined by the PDC and PDPA.

Some of the international players, such as the 4 from the European Order of Merit, and the top American and Australian players are entered straight into the first round, while others, having won qualifying events in their countries, are entered into the preliminary round.

Order of Merit

Pro Tour
  Dave Chisnall
  Mark Hylton
  Scott Rand
  Richie Burnett
  Michael van Gerwen
  John Henderson
  Nigel Heydon
  Roland Scholten
  Steve Farmer
  Magnus Caris
  James Richardson
  Dennis Smith
  Jelle Klaasen
  Michael Smith
  Kim Huybrechts
  Ian White

European Order of MeritFirst Round Qualifiers
  Antonio Alcinas
  Mensur Suljović
  Jyhan Artut
  Kurt van de Rijck

PDPA QualifiersFirst Round Qualifier
  Arron Monk
Preliminary Round Qualifier
  Joe Cullen

PDC Youth Tour QualifierPreliminary Round Qualifier
  Paul Barham

International QualifiersFirst Round Qualifiers
  Darin Young
  Sean Reed
  Geoff Kime

Preliminary Round Qualifiers
  Dietmar Burger
  Oliver Ferenc
  Connie Finnan
  Warren French
  Petri Korte
  Per Laursen
  Lee Choon Peng
  Scott MacKenzie
  Kevin Münch
  Haruki Muramatsu
  Dennis Nilsson
  José de Sousa
  Ian Perez
  Devon Petersen

In case a player has to withdraw from the competition, the first reserve player that will take his spot is the third-place finisher in the PDPA qualifier, Chris Thompson. It is the first time a match for third place was held at the qualifier.

Prize money
The 2012 World Championship features a prize fund of £1,000,000 – the same as in the previous two years.

The prize money is allocated as follows:

Draw
The draw was made on 29 November 2011, live on Sky Sports News by Rod Harrington & Keith Deller.

Preliminary round
The format is best of 7 legs. One match is played each day with the winner playing his first round match that same day. The draw for the preliminary round was held on 28 November 2011.

Last 64
The winners of the eight preliminary round matches joined 56 other players in the first round. The schedule was published on 2 December 2011.

1 Denis Ovens had to retire due to an injured nerve in his back after the first set. Münch had won the first set 3–0.

Final

Statistics
{|class="wikitable sortable" style="font-size: 95%; text-align: right"
|-
! Player
! Eliminated
! Played
! Sets Won
! Sets Lost
! Legs Won
! Legs Lost
! 100+
! 140+
! 180s
! High checkout
! Average
|-
|align="left"|  Adrian Lewis
| Winner
| 6
| 29
| 15
| 105
| 78
| 215
| 121
| 50
| 170
| 94.93
|-
|align="left"|  Andy Hamilton
| Runner-up
| 6
| 25
| 19
| 100
| 83
| 224
| 101
| 47
| 147
| 96.74
|-
|align="left"|  Simon Whitlock
| Semi-final
| 5
| 21
| 11
| 76
| 53
| 161
| 90
| 44
| 170
| 98.15
|-
|align="left"|  James Wade
| Semi-final
| 5
| 21
| 11
| 76
| 55
| 204
| 100
| 20
| 157
| 93.60
|-
|align="left"|  Terry Jenkins
| Quarter-final
| 4
| 14
| 7
| 49
| 36
| 101
| 77
| 20
| 126
| 96.17
|-
|align="left"|  Gary Anderson
| Quarter-final
| 4
| 12
| 10
| 53
| 45
| 113
| 67
| 35
| 151
| 95.87
|-
|align="left"|  Kim Huybrechts
| Quarter-final
| 4
| 13
| 7
| 46
| 33
| 95
| 57
| 16
| 128
| 92.63
|-
|align="left"|  John Part
| Quarter-final
| 4
| 15
| 8
| 45
| 44
| 108
| 65
| 17
| 167
| 91.40
|-
|align="left"|  Dave Chisnall
| Third round
| 3
| 7
| 5
| 28
| 25
| 61
| 36
| 16
| 127
| 95.97
|-
|align="left"|  Kevin Painter
| Third round
| 3
| 9
| 8
| 41
| 35
| 98
| 56
| 16
| 134
| 94.07
|-
|align="left"|  Paul Nicholson
| Third round
| 3
| 8
| 5
| 29
| 23
| 64
| 46
| 10
| 170
| 93.69
|-
|align="left"|  Wayne Jones
| Third round
| 3
| 7
| 5
| 26
| 21
| 74
| 33
| 14
| 116
| 93.05
|-
|align="left"|  Michael van Gerwen
| Third round
| 3
| 10
| 6
| 31
| 25
| 71
| 42
| 14
| 158
| 92.62
|-
|align="left"|  Justin Pipe
| Third round
| 3
| 8
| 8
| 34
| 34
| 89
| 52
| 13
| 121
| 92.38
|-
|align="left"|  Colin Lloyd
| Third round
| 3
| 8
| 6
| 29
| 29
| 72
| 28
| 13
| 167
| 91.03
|-
|align="left"|  Steve Farmer
| Third round
| 3
| 7
| 8
| 32
| 32
| 81
| 34
| 12
| 102
| 87.24
|-
|align="left"|  Phil Taylor
|Second round 
| 2
| 4
| 4
| 19
| 17
| 46
| 23
| 5
| 98
| 100.15
|-
|align="left"|  Mervyn King
| Second round 
| 2
| 4
| 4
| 19
| 12
| 38
| 25
| 12
| 132
| 98.47
|-
|align="left"|  Richie Burnett
| Second round
| 2
| 4
| 6
| 18
| 23
| 51
| 30
| 16
| 136
| 94.78
|-
|align="left"|  Vincent van der Voort
|Second round
| 2
| 6
| 6
| 27
| 24
| 70
| 27
| 15
| 148
| 94.68
|-
|align="left"|  Scott Rand
| Second round
| 2
| 4
| 4
| 18
| 14
| 29
| 21
| 7
| 140
| 93.75
|-
|align="left"|  Robert Thornton
| Second round
| 2
| 5
| 5
| 19
| 23
| 65
| 29
| 8
| 121
| 93.18
|-
|align="left"|  Mark Walsh
| Second round
| 2
| 6
| 5
| 22
| 23
| 56
| 36
| 8
| 96
| 92.69
|-
|align="left"|  Wes Newton
| Second round
| 2
| 6
| 4
| 24
| 22
| 57
| 29
| 8
| 170
| 91.98
|-
|align="left"|  Devon Petersen
| Second round 
| 3
| 5
| 6
| 27
| 29
| 64
| 35
| 16
| 120
| 88.46
|-
|align="left"|  James Richardson
| Second round
| 2
| 4
| 4
| 18
| 18
| 58
| 28
| 4
| 145
| 88.09
|-
|align="left"|  Kevin Münch
| Second round
| 3
| 3
| 4
| 19
| 16
| 38
| 27
| 4
| 155
| 87.66
|-
|align="left"|  Jelle Klaasen
| Second round
| 2
| 3
| 5
| 14
| 16
| 38
| 12
| 4
| 120
| 86.57
|-
|align="left"|  Alan Tabern
|Second round 
| 2
| 3
| 5
| 13
| 19
| 51
| 17
| 5
| 149
| 86.50
|-
|align="left"|  Co Stompé
| Second round
| 2
| 4
| 4
| 16
| 17
| 46
| 20
| 7
| 97
| 86.30
|-
|align="left"|  Steve Beaton
| Second round 
| 2
| 4
| 6
| 20
| 24
| 59
| 21
| 3
| 121
| 86.27
|-
|align="left"|  Roland Scholten
| Second round
| 2
| 3
| 5
| 12
| 19
| 31
| 15
| 10
| 138
| 82.50
|-
|align="left"|  Antonio Alcinas
| First round
| 1
| 2
| 3
| 8
| 13
| 24
| 15
| 5
| 123
| 98.76
|-
|align="left"|  Nigel Heydon
| First round
| 1
| 2
| 3
| 12
| 14
| 39
| 15
| 7
| 100
| 91.30
|-
|align="left"|  Mark Webster
| First round
| 1
| 2
| 3
| 11
| 13
| 29
| 11
| 9
| 100
| 89.72
|-
|align="left"|  Mark Hylton
| First round
| 1
| 2
| 3
| 8
| 13
| 29
| 17
| 3
| 104
| 89.49
|-
|align="left"|  Ronnie Baxter
| First round
| 1
| 2
| 3
| 8
| 13
| 24
| 14
| 2
| 98
| 88.79
|-
|align="left"|  Magnus Caris
| First round
| 1
| 2
| 3
| 10
| 11
| 30
| 16
| 2
| 107
| 87.21
|-
|align="left"|  Kurt van de Rijck
| First round
| 1
| 0
| 3
| 5
| 9
| 22
| 11
| 3
| 136
| 93.84
|-
|align="left"|  Mensur Suljović
| First round
| 1
| 1
| 3
| 7
| 11
| 30
| 5
| 3
| 121
| 90.36
|-
|align="left"|  Arron Monk
| First round
| 1
| 1
| 3
| 8
| 11
| 22
| 10
| 3
| 87
| 90.03
|-
|align="left"|  Ian White
| First round
| 1
| 1
| 3
| 9
| 10
| 26
| 15
| 3
| 64
| 90.02
|-
|align="left"|  Colin Osborne
| First round
| 1
| 1
| 3
| 7
| 9
| 20
| 11
| 1
| 84
| 89.81
|-
|align="left"|  Peter Wright
| First round
| 1
| 1
| 3
| 4
| 10
| 17
| 6
| 4
| 83
| 88.40
|-
|align="left"|  Raymond van Barneveld
| First round
| 1
| 0
| 3
| 5
| 9
| 22
| 5
| 5
| 130
| 91.02
|-
|align="left"|  Joe Cullen
| First round
| 2
| 0
| 3
| 7
| 11
| 14
| 10
| 3
| 83
| 89.01
|-
|align="left"|  Jyhan Artut
| First round
| 1
| 2
| 3
| 13
| 14
| 23
| 18
| 8
| 116
| 86.94
|-
|align="left"|  Steve Brown
| First round
| 1
| 2
| 3
| 11
| 12
| 31
| 11
| 3
| 130
| 86.60
|-
|align="left"|  Warren French
| First round
| 2
| 1
| 3
| 9
| 14
| 33
| 13
| 3
| 70
| 85.59
|-
|align="left"|  Darin Young
| First round
| 1
| 1
| 3
| 6
| 10
| 23
| 5
| 3
| 118
| 85.31
|-
|align="left"|  Petri Korte
| First round
| 2
| 1
| 3
| 9
| 13
| 18
| 9
| 4
| 112
| 84.27
|-
|align="left"|  Jamie Caven
| First round
| 1
| 1
| 3
| 7
| 9
| 14
| 5
| 4
| 97
| 83.62
|-
|align="left"|  Sean Reed
| First round
| 1
| 1
| 3
| 6
| 9
| 18
| 8
| 0
| 121
| 82.29
|-
|align="left"|  Mark Dudbridge
| First round
| 1
| 0
| 3
| 3
| 9
| 16
| 8
| 1
| 82
| 86.74
|-
|align="left"|  Haruki Muramatsu
| First round
| 2
| 0
| 3
| 7
| 11
| 26
| 16
| 0
| 102
| 86.54
|-
|align="left"|  Michael Smith
| First round
| 1
| 0
| 3
| 3
| 9
| 23
| 7
| 1
| 25
| 85.45
|-
|align="left"|  Dennis Smith
| First round
| 1
| 0
| 3
| 1
| 9
| 13
| 4
| 2
| 44
| 84.57
|-
|align="left"|  Brendan Dolan
| First round
| 1
| 0
| 3
| 2
| 9
| 19
| 6
| 0
| 56
| 82.38
|-
|align="left"|  John Henderson
| First round
| 1
| 0
| 3
| 2
| 9
| 16
| 2
| 2
| 67
| 80.39
|-
|align="left"|  Christian Perez
| First round
| 2
| 1
| 3
| 11
| 10
| 30
| 17
| 2
| 110
| 79.67
|-
|align="left"|  Scott MacKenzie
| First round
| 2
| 1
| 3
| 10
| 12
| 34
| 10
| 1
| 100
| 79.30
|-
|align="left"|  Per Laursen
| Preliminary round
| 1
| 0
| 0
| 3
| 4
| 13
| 4
| 1
| 137
| 89.76
|-
|align="left"|  Oliver Ferenc
| Preliminary round
| 1
| 0
| 0
| 2
| 4
| 6
| 6
| 0
| 32
| 87.88
|-
|align="left"|  Connie Finnan
| Preliminary round
| 1
| 0
| 0
| 3
| 4
| 8
| 3
| 2
| 121
| 83.15
|-
|align="left"|  José Oliveira de Sousa
| Preliminary round
| 1
| 0
| 0
| 3
| 4
| 3
| 4
| 1
| 83
| 75.61
|-
|align="left"|  Lee Choon Peng
| Preliminary round
| 1
| 0
| 0
| 2
| 4
| 11
| 1
| 0
| 120
| 77.88
|-
|align="left"|  Dennis Nilsson
| Preliminary round
| 1
| 0
| 0
| 2
| 4
| 10
| 2
| 0
| 58
| 77.20
|-
|align="left"|  Paul Barham
| Preliminary round
| 1
| 0
| 0
| 2
| 4
| 6
| 6
| 0
| 20
| 76.83
|-
|align="left"|  Andy Smith
| First round
| 1
| 0
| 3
| 0
| 9
| 9
| 8
| 1
| —
| 84.50
|-
|align="left"|  Geoff Kime
| First round
| 1
| 0
| 3
| 0
| 9
| 8
| 0
| 1
| —
| 66.13
|-
|align="left"|  Dietmar Burger
| Preliminary round
| 1
| 0
| 0
| 0
| 4
| 5
| 1
| 0
| —
| 67.44
|-
|align="left"|  Denis Ovens
| First round
| 1
| 0
| 1
| 0
| 3
| 1
| 1
| 0
| —
| 65.64

Representation from different countries
This table shows the number of players by country in the World Championship, the total number including the preliminary round.

Television coverage
The tournament was broadcast by Sky Sports in the UK and Ireland, RTL 7 in the Netherlands, Sport1 in Germany, Fox Sports in Australia and Showtime in the Middle East.

References

External links
 The official site of the Ladbrokes.com PDC World Darts Championship
 NetZone
 2012 PDC World Darts Championship at Sky Sports

2012
2011 in darts
2012 in darts
2011 sports events in London
2012 sports events in London
2012 in British sport
December 2011 sports events in the United Kingdom
January 2012 sports events in the United Kingdom
International sports competitions in London
Alexandra Palace